Moat House is a Grade II* listed building situated in Lichfield Road, Sutton Coldfield, West Midlands. It is part of the Anchorage Road conservation area.

The property was designed and built in 1680 as a mansion house by William Wilson, builder, architect and student of Sir Christopher Wren, as a home for his new wife, a wealthy local widow Jane Pudsey who had previously owned Langley Hall with her first husband.

The original gatehouse or lodge, itself a Grade II listed building, and stone bridge remain but no traces of the 'moat' remain. The moat survived until 1860, until which it had to be crossed by a small stone bridge. A sundial is attached to the side of the building.

The property was occupied by the adjacent Sutton Coldfield College.

The Moat House is now the home of Urban Village Group.

References

Grade II* listed buildings in the West Midlands (county)
Country houses in the West Midlands (county)
Houses in Birmingham, West Midlands
Houses completed in 1680
Sutton Coldfield
1680 establishments in England